XHDH-FM is a radio station in Ciudad Acuña, Coahuila, Mexico. Broadcasting on 91.5 FM, XHDH carries the Exa FM format from MVS Radio.

History
The station began as XEDH-AM 1340, with a concession awarded to Vicente Hernández on January 13, 1938. In 1949, the station was sold to Óscar González Galindo, and in January 1987, it became part of Grupo RCG with its concession owned by Roberto Casimiro González Treviño.

In the late 2000s, XHDH was sold to Nova Teleradio. In 2012, it migrated to FM on 91.5 MHz.

In September 2021, Grupo Región began operating the station; it rebranded as "Región 91.5 Exa FM" with no change in format.

References

External links
Región 91.5 Exa FM Facebook

1938 establishments in Mexico
Radio stations established in 1938
Radio stations in Coahuila
Spanish-language radio stations
Contemporary hit radio stations in Mexico